Babajide David Akintola (born 13 January 1996) is a Nigerian professional footballer who plays as a winger for Adana Demirspor.

Club career

Youth
David is a product of FC Ebedei.

Has played in the Torneo Bellinzona Under-18, making one assist, and is viewed as one of Nigeria's most anticipated young talents.

David transferred to FC Midtjylland in November 2014 from his new clubs cooperative club, FC Ebedei. He played for Midtjylland U19 in the 2014–2015 season, where they won the league. He helped the team, scoring 9 goals.

Midtjylland
Before being loaned to Thisted FC, David was promoted to the Midtjylland senior team prior to the new season.

David was loaned out to Norwegian First Division-side FK Jerv on 11 March 2017 for the rest of the season. On 16 February 2018, he was loaned out again, this time to FK Haugesund.

In February 2019, David was once again sent out on loan, this time to Rosenborg with the option to make the move permanent after the 2019 season.

In January 2020, David signed a six-month loan contract with Omonia Nicosia.

On 28 September 2020, David joined newly promoted Turkish Süper Lig club Hatayspor on a one-year loan.

Adana Demirspor
On 27 July 2021, Akintola transferred to Adana Demirspor on an undisclosed fee.

Career statistics

Club

References

1996 births
Living people
Nigerian footballers
Association football wingers
Danish Superliga players
Eliteserien players
Norwegian First Division players
Cypriot First Division players
Süper Lig players
F.C. Ebedei players
FC Midtjylland players
Thisted FC players
FK Haugesund players
FK Jerv players
Rosenborg BK players
AC Omonia players
Hatayspor footballers
Adana Demirspor footballers
Nigerian expatriate footballers
Nigerian expatriate sportspeople in Denmark
Nigerian expatriate sportspeople in Norway
Nigerian expatriate sportspeople in Cyprus
Nigerian expatriate sportspeople in Turkey
Expatriate men's footballers in Denmark
Expatriate footballers in Norway
Expatriate footballers in Cyprus
Expatriate footballers in Turkey